Joseph Neri (26 July 1914 – 11 October 2005) was a French racing cyclist. He rode in the 1947 Tour de France.

References

External links
 

1914 births
2005 deaths
French male cyclists
Sportspeople from Cannes
Cyclists from Provence-Alpes-Côte d'Azur